House at 233 James Street is a historic home located at Canastota in Madison County, New York.  It was built about 1846 and is an "L"-shaped frame residence with Greek Revival style features.  It is composed of a two-story main block with a one-story service wing.

It was added to the National Register of Historic Places in 1986.

References

Houses on the National Register of Historic Places in New York (state)
Greek Revival houses in New York (state)
Houses completed in 1846
Houses in Madison County, New York
National Register of Historic Places in Madison County, New York